Kerispatih is an Indonesian pop band. Founded in 2003, as of 2010 they have released five albums, three going platinum.

History
Kerispatih was founded on 22 April 2003. They started by playing ethnic Indonesian music, releasing their first album, Gulalikustik, in 2004. After being approached and signed by the record label Nagaswara, they switched to pop as it was more commercially viable.

Their first album with Nagaswara, Kejujuran Hati (The Heart's Honesty), was released in 2005 and went platinum; three songs from the album, "Kejujuran Hati", "Cinta Putih" ("White Love") and "Lagu Rindu" ("Song of Longing"), were released as singles. In 2007, they released a second album, Kenyataan Perasaan (The Truth of the Feelings), with the songs "Mengenangmu" ("Remembering You"), "Tapi Bukan Aku" ("But Not I"), "Sepanjang Usia" ("For All My Life") and "Untuk Pertama Kali" ("For the First Time") as singles; this album also went platinum. That same year they also sang one song, "Kawan" ("Friend") for the compilation album Rinduku Padamu (My Longing For You), written by Indonesian President Susilo Bambang Yudhoyono; the album sold 40,000 copies. 

Another platinum certified album, Tak Lekang Oleh Waktu (Unbridled by Time) was released the following year, with singer Syahrini as a guest vocalist; the album also featured a song, "Kawanku" ("My Friend") written by President Yudhyono. Selling 25,000 copies in a short period of time, two of its songs were released as singles, "Bila Rasaku Ini Rasamu" ("If this Feeling of Mine is Yours") and "Demi Cinta" ("For Love"). This was followed in 2009 by Semua Tentang Cinta (Everything About Love), which had one single.

Sammy's departure & new vocalist
At first, the band consisted of vocalist Hendra Samuel Simorangkir (Sammy), keyboardist Doadibadai Hollo (Badai), guitarist Arief Nurdiansyah Morada, drummer M. Anton Suryo Sularjo Wahyu Nugroho Kusumo, and bassist Andika Putrasahadewa. After Sammy was arrested and convicted of possession of crystal meth in 2010, he was fired from the group and replaced by Fandy Santoso, a finalist in the fourth season of Indonesian Idol.

Style
According to Kerispatih, their lyrics are based on real life situations and experiences.

Discography

Solo albums
Gulalikustik (2004)
Kejujuran Hati (The Heart's Honesty; 2005)
Kenyataan Perasaan (The Truth of the Feelings; 2007)
Tak Lekang Oleh Waktu (Unbridled by Time; 2008)
Semua Tentang Cinta (Everything About Love; 2009)
Melekat di Jiwa (Inherent In Life; 2011)

Band members

Current members
 Fandy Santoso — lead vocals (2010–present)
 Arief Morada — lead guitar (2003–present)
 Anton Suryo Kusumo — drums (2003–present)

Former members
 Sammy Simorangkir - lead vocals (2003-2010)
 Badai (Doadibadai Hollo) - keyboards, backing vocals (2003-2016)
 Andika Putrasahadewa — bass (2003–2018; died 2018)

References
Footnotes

Bibliography

Musical groups from Jakarta
Musical groups established in 2003